The Raetia football team represents Raetia in ConIFA association football. The current head coach is Simone Fontana. The team is commonly referred to as The Grisons.

History
Raetia's first game was played in December 2011 against the Chagos Islands national football team. The second game took place in January 2012 on the island of Gozo against Gozo.

The first home game was on 26 May 2012 against the fifth Team of FC St. Pauli in Domat/Ems and Raetia won 6–0.

Raetia was qualified to play the 2012 VIVA World Cup in the northern Iraqi region of Kurdistan. In the group matches they gained a victory against Tamil Eelam and a loss to Zanzibar the 2nd rank and missed the semi-finals only because of goal difference.

On 6 September 2015 Raetia beat Franconia 6–0 and qualified for the 2016 ConIFA World Football Cup in Abkhazia.

National anthem

The national anthem of Raetia is "A Tgalaveina":

Players and managers

Notable players

  Mirco Oswald - captain

Managers

Competitive record

VIVA World Cup

ConIFA World Football Cup

EUROPEADA European Championship

In 2008, 2010 and 2012 the Raetian national team was not at the tournament but a selection of the Rhaeto-Romance speaking part of the canton of Grisons.

Schedule

All time results and upcoming fixtures

Home stadium
Raetia does not have a national stadium as such, though major matches are usually played in Chur, Ems or Trin. Other large grounds which could be used include Vaduz and Bellinzona.

Colours
Raetia's traditional kit is a white jersey with black, accompanied by black shorts and socks while their current away kit is a royal blue shirt. As a reference to the 60th jubilee of Queen Elizabeth, Raetia has worn the blue shirts on 9 June 2012 against Tamil Eelam.

The colours blue-white-grey/black are the national colours of Raetia.

Raetias's historical kits
Collections of kits used by The Grisons

Songs for competitions
Rapper Gimma made an unreleased song to encourage the national football team for the 2012 VIVA World Cup:

References 

European national and official selection-teams not affiliated to FIFA
CONIFA member associations
Football in Switzerland